Nevado Tres Cruces Central is the second summit of an extinct volcanic massif, located in the Andes mountain range in the Atacama region of northern (Chile).

This summit, the second in altitude of the Tres Cruces massif, reaches 6629 meters above sea level, and a topographic prominence of nearly 610 meters in relation to the main or south summit. It is the highest summit located entirely in Chilean territory. Along with the south summit, it is the most visited of the massif;  the col that connects them allows the ascent of both during the same expedition. That is the case of the first summiters, the Poles Stefan Osiecki and Witold Paryski, on 26 February 1937.

It has a crater of about one kilometer diameter.

References

External links 
 Nevado Tres Cruces Central description in Andeshandbook (in Spanish)

Volcanoes of Atacama Region
Mountains of Chile